Ptocheuusa paupella, the light fleabane neb, is a moth of the family Gelechiidae. It is found from central and southern Europe to the Ural Mountains. It is also found in Turkey and India.

The wingspan is 10–12 mm. The ground colour is buff, streaked with whitish and with darker speckling. The forewings are light ochreous-yellow, with some black scales mostly arranged in longitudinal rows; margins, a median longitudinal streak from base to middle, an indistinct inwardly oblique slender fascia before middle and another at 3/4, and sometimes two or three faint longitudinal lines in disc posteriorly white. Hindwings are pale grey. The larva is pale yellowish; head and two spots on 2 dark fuscous, head pale brown.

Adults are on wing in June and again from August to September.

The larvae feed in the seedheads of Pulicaria dysenterica, Centaurea nigra and Inula crithmoides.

References

Moths described in 1847
Ptocheuusa
Moths of Asia
Moths of Europe
Insects of Turkey